The 40th Daytime Emmy Awards, presented by the National Academy of Television Arts and Sciences (NATAS), "recognizes outstanding achievement in all fields of daytime television production and are presented to individuals and programs broadcast from 2:00 a.m. to 6:00 p.m. during the 2012 calendar year". The ceremony took place on June 16, 2013 at The Beverly Hilton,  in Beverly Hills, California beginning at 5:00 p.m. PST / 8:00 p.m. EST. The ceremony was televised in the United States by  HLN and executive produced by Gabriel Gornell.

The evening was hosted by Sam Champion, A. J. Hammer and Robin Meade for the first time and the pre-show ceremony was hosted by Hammer and Christi Paul. The drama pre-nominees were announced on February 27, 2013, and the nominations were announced during an episode of Good Morning America on May 1, 2013.  

The acceptance speech format was altered to add live on-stage interviews with recipients directly following their acceptance speeches for the first time in award show history. In related events,  the 40th Annual Creative Arts Emmy Awards ceremony was held at the Westin Bonaventure in Los Angeles on June 14, 2013.

The Bold and the Beautiful won the most awards, with four trophies including for Outstanding Drama Series Directing Team and five other Creative Arts Emmy Awards out of their 11 nominations. Days of Our Lives won two awards including Outstanding Drama Series. The Ellen DeGeneres Show won its fourth award in the Outstanding Talk Show Entertainment category. The Young and the Restless had received the most nominations, with a total of 23 (including Creative Arts Emmy Awards). Steve Harvey received two nominations for hosting duties, one in Outstanding Game Show Host for Family Feud and the other in Outstanding Talk Show Host for Steve Harvey. The Lifetime Achievement Awards were presented to Monty Hall and Bob Stewart. The ceremony attracted 913,000 viewers.

Winners and nominees

In the lists below, the winner of the category is shown first, with a double-dagger, followed by the other nominees.

Lifetime Achievement Award
Monty Hall
Bob Stewart

Presenters and performances

The following individuals presented awards or performed musical acts.

Presenters

Performers

References

040
Daytime Emmy Awards
Emmy Awards